The 2020 Campeones Cup was planned to be the third edition of the Campeones Cup, an annual North American football match contested between the champions of the previous Major League Soccer season and the winner of the Campeón de Campeones from Liga MX.

The match would have featured Seattle Sounders FC, winners of the MLS Cup 2019, and the winners of the 2020 Campeón de Campeones—either C.F. Monterrey or another Liga MX side. The Sounders were planned to host the match at CenturyLink Field in Seattle, Washington, United States, on August 12, 2020. The match was canceled on May 19, 2020, due to the COVID-19 pandemic.

Match

Details

References

External links

2020
2020 in American soccer
2020–21 in Mexican football
Seattle Sounders FC matches
Campeones Cup